Semyono-Pokrovskoye is a rural locality (a selo) and the administrative centre of Irtyubaksky Selsoviet, Kugarchinsky District, Bashkortostan, Russia. The population was 348 as of 2010. There are 4 streets.

Geography 
Semyono-Pokrovskoye is located 30 km northwest of Mrakovo (the district's administrative centre) by road. Yumaguzino is the nearest rural locality.

References 

Rural localities in Kugarchinsky District